Awun (Auwon) is a Sepik language spoken in Yakeltim village of Namea Rural LLG, Sandaun Province, Papua-New Guinea.

References

Yellow River languages
Languages of Sandaun Province